The Nancy Oldfield Trust is a waterway society, a charitable trust and a registered charity no. 1068549 in Norfolk, East Anglia, England, UK. 

The Trust is based at Neatishead on the Norfolk Broads and provides boating opportunities and water-based activities for disabled and disadvantaged people from anywhere in the United Kingdom. It was founded in 1984 by Richard Kenyon in memory of his parents.

The Trust operates three motor cruisers, one of them electric, seven sailing yachts, and several canoes.  The motor boats have wheelchair lifts, and hoists are available for all other boats. 

There is also a residential centre, and "The Ark", a floating pontoon base on Barton Broad.  Visitors can fish during the season, and many enjoy bird watching whilst on the boats.

The Trust offers courses and activities, run by Royal Yachting Association trained staff and 40 volunteers.

The Trust is a RYA Training Centre, and runs training courses in sailing throughout the year, which lead to RYA qualifications.

See also
List of waterway societies in the United Kingdom
Boating charities for disabled persons:
Accessible Boating Association
Seagull Trust
Peter Le Marchant Trust
Royal Yachting Association
Broads Authority
Inland Waterways Association

External links
The Broads Authority website, new passenger boat for Nancy Oldfield Trust
MENCAP site, entry for Nancy Oldfield Trust
Norfolk and Waveney Mental Health Partnership NHS Trust press release, Nancy Oldfield Trust

Disabled boating
Clubs and societies in Norfolk
Charities based in Norfolk
Transport charities based in the United Kingdom